Blueeyes Productions was an Icelandic film production company. The company was founded in 1999 by director Baltasar Kormákur and his wife Lilja Pálmadóttir. After producing 12 films, RVK Studios has superseded the company and movies like Everest and Fúsi were then produced by the name RVK Studios.

Films
 2012 The Deep
 2012 Contraband
 2010 Summerland
 2008 Reykjavík-Rotterdam
 2008 White Night Wedding
 2006 Jar City
 2005 A Little Trip to Heaven
 2004 Dís
 2003 Stormy Weather
 2002 The Sea
 2000 101 Reykjavík (as 101 ehf.)
 1998 Popp í Reykjavík (as 101 ehf.)

External links

 Blueeyes Productions

Film production companies of Iceland